The 1976 Commercial Union Assurance Grand Prix was a professional tennis circuit administered by the International Lawn Tennis Federation (ILTF) which served as a forerunner to the current Association of Tennis Professionals (ATP) World Tour and the Women's Tennis Association (WTA) Tour. The circuit consisted of the four modern Grand Slam tournaments and open tournaments recognised by the ILTF. The Commercial Union Assurance Masters is included in this calendar but did not count towards the Grand Prix ranking.

The 1976 Grand Prix circuit consisted of 48 tournaments held in 21 different countries.

Schedule
Key

December 1975

May

June

July

August

September

October

November

December

Points system
The tournaments listed above were divided into six groups. Group TC consisted of the Triple Crown—the French Open, the Wimbledon Championships and the US Open—while the other tournaments were given star ratings ranging from five stars to one star, based on prize money and draw size. Points were allocated based on these ratings and the finishing position of a player in a tournament. No points were awarded to first-round losers, and ties were settled by the number of tournaments played. The points allocation, with doubles points listed in brackets, is as follows:

Standings
The 1976 Grand Prix tournaments were divided in six separate point categories, ranging from the Triple Crown tournaments (150 points for the winner) to the smallest One Star tournaments (40 points for the winner). At the end of the year the 35 top-ranked players received a bonus from the bonus pool. To qualify for a bonus a player must have played a minimum amount of One and Two Star tournaments. The top eight points ranked singles players and top four doubles teams were entitled to participate in  the season-ending Masters tournament.

ATP rankings
These are the ATP rankings of the top twenty singles players at the end of the 1975 season  and at the end of the 1976 season, with numbers of ranking points, points averages, numbers of tournaments played, year-end rankings in 1976, highest and lowest positions during the season and number of spots gained or lost from the first rankings to the year-end rankings.

List of tournament winners
The list of winners and number of Grand Prix singles titles won, alphabetically by last name:
 Paolo Bertolucci (1) Barcelona
 Björn Borg (3) Düsseldorf, Wimbledon, Boston
 Jimmy Connors (6) Washington, North Conway, Indianapolis, US Open, Cologne, Wembley
 Mark Cox (1) Stockholm
 Eddie Dibbs (2) Hamburg, Paris (Jean Becker)
 Mark Edmondson (1) Australian Open
 Brian Fairlie (1) Manila
 Wojciech Fibak (2) Bournemouth, Vienna
 Brian Gottfried (1) Los Angeles
 Geoff Masters (1) Sydney Indoor
 Ilie Năstase (1) South Orange
 Manuel Orantes (5) Munich, Kitzbühel, Madrid, Barcelona, Masters
 Adriano Panatta (2) Rome, French Open
 Víctor Pecci (2) Madrid, Berlin
 Raúl Ramírez (2) Gstaad, London
 Cliff Richey (1) Bermuda
 Ken Rosewall (1) Hong Kong
 Ray Ruffels (1) Perth
 Harold Solomon (2) Maui, Johannesburg
 Roscoe Tanner (4) Cincinnati, Columbus, San Francisco, Tokyo Outdoor
 Balázs Taróczy (1) Hilversum
 Guillermo Vilas (3) Montreal, São Paulo. Buenos Aires
 Kim Warwick (1) Bangalore
 Antonio Zugarelli (1) Båstad

The following players won their first Grand Prix title in 1976:
 Mark Edmondson Australian Open
 Wojtek Fibak Stockholm
 Geoff Masters Sydney Indoor
 Víctor Pecci Madrid
 Kim Warwick Bangalore
 Antonio Zugarelli Båstad

See also
 1976 World Championship Tennis circuit
 1976 WTA Tour

Notes

References

External links
ATP Archive 1976: Commercial Union Grand Prix Tournaments
ATP – History Mens Professional Tours

Further reading

 
Grand Prix tennis circuit seasons
Grand Prix